Villers-Saint-Frambourg-Ognon is a commune in the northern French department of Oise. It was established on 1 January 2019 by merger of the former communes of Villers-Saint-Frambourg (the seat) and Ognon.

See also
Communes of the Oise department

References

Communes of Oise
Communes nouvelles of Oise
Populated places established in 2019
2019 establishments in France